Ambra Sabatini (born 19 January 2002) is an Italian Paralympic athlete.

She competed at the Dubai 2021 Paralympic World Cup, setting a world record.

The accident
On 5 June 2019, while on her way to an athletics training, Ambra had a road crash as a passenger on the scooter driven by her father. Their vehicle was hit by a truck and as a result of the injuries sustained, Ambra suffered the amputation of her left leg above the knee.

World records
 100 m T63: 14.11 ( Tokyo, 4 September 2021) - current holder

See also
 List of IPC world records in athletics

References

External links
 

2002 births
Living people
Paralympic athletes of Italy
Athletes (track and field) at the 2020 Summer Paralympics
World record holders in Paralympic athletics
Paralympic athletes of Fiamme Gialle
Italian amputees
Sportspeople from Livorno
Italian female sprinters